John Crow was the fifth governor of the Bank of Canada.

John Crow may also refer to:

John crow, a local name for the turkey vulture in Jamaica
John Crow Mountains, a range of mountains in Jamaica
John David Crow (born 1935), Heisman Trophy winner
Jack Crow, recurring name used by author, John Steakley

See also
John Crowe (disambiguation)

Crow, John